Trox sabulosus is a beetle of the family Trogidae.

References 

sabulosus
Beetles described in 1758